Ben Ali may refer to:

People
 Ben Ali (businessman) (1927–2009), founder of the restaurant Ben's Chili Bowl in Washington, DC, USA
 Ben Ali (wrestler), Egyptian Olympic wrestler
 Habib Ben Ali (1941–1996), Tunisian criminal and brother of Zine el-Abidine Ben Ali
 Ibrahim Ben Ali (1756–1800), soldier and physician who was one of the earliest American settlers of Turkish origin
 Zine El Abidine Ben Ali (1936–2019), former President of Tunisia, 1987–2011
 James Ben Ali Haggin (1822–1914), American businessman 
 James Ben Ali Haggin III (1882–1951), American artist and designer

Other
 Ben Ali (horse), winner of the 1886 Kentucky Derby
 Ben Ali, Sacramento, California, place in the USA